Video Immersion is the name of a set of computer graphics processing technologies, used by ATI Technologies in their Radeon video cards.  It is the brand name ATI uses to refer to the video compression acceleration feature in their R100, R200, and R300 video cards.  Video Immersion is present in R100 based cards, and ATI introduced Video Immersion II with the R200.

Video Immersion II improved the de-interlacing, temporal filtering, component video, and resolution.

Video Immersion has been superseded by Unified Video Decoder (UVD) and Video Coding Engine (VCE).

Features
 iDCT
 Adaptive De-Interlacing
 Motion Compensation
 Video Scaling
 Alpha Blending
 Colorspace Conversion
 Run-Level Decode & De-ZigZag

See also
 Unified Video Decoder (UVD)
 Video Coding Engine (VCE)

References

ATI Technologies
Graphics cards
Video acceleration